The 1960-61 NBA season was the Knicks' 15th season in the NBA.

Draft picks

Regular season

Season standings

x – clinched playoff spot

Record vs. opponents

Game log

References

New York Knicks seasons
New York
New York Knicks
New York Knicks
1960s in Manhattan
Madison Square Garden